Nick Ward may refer to:

Nick Ward (basketball) (born 1997), American basketball player
Nick Ward (footballer, born 1977), Welsh footballer
Nick Ward (musician), Welsh singer / songwriter
Nick Ward (physician), British physician and expert on smallpox
Nick Ward (soccer, born 1985), Australian association footballer
Nick Ward, in original lineup of Australian band The Church
Nicholas Ward (boxer) (1811–1850), English bare-knuckle fighter

See also
Nicholas Ward (disambiguation)